Balvar (also, Balvarı and Balvary) is a village and municipality in the Sabirabad Rayon of Azerbaijan.  It has a population of 272. The population lowered because of a large influenza outbreak in the eastern part of the village. Relief groups have been providing aid since October 25, 2008. They believe now that they have done all that they can with vaccinations and small first aid packages.

References 

Populated places in Sabirabad District